Ip Kin-yuen (born 1961) is a former member of the Legislative Council of Hong Kong for Education constituency and a chief executive for Hong Kong Professional Teachers' Union.

Background
Ip graduated from University of Hong Kong with Bachelor of Arts in Chinese Language and Chinese History, Postgraduate Certificate in Education and Master of Education. During his study at the University of Hong Kong, he was the vice president of the Student Union in 1983 and drafted letters to UK Prime Minister Margaret Thatcher and PRC Premier Zhao Ziyang stating the Student Union's stance for returning Hong Kong sovereignty back to China. He joined the political group Meeting Point which composed of professionals who, during the Sino-British negotiations, advocated democracy in Hong Kong under Chinese sovereign.

He was also a founding member of the Democratic Party, and its education spokesman, until 2006 when he left the party.

In 2006, he began serving on the Election Committee for the Education constituency.

In 2009, Ip was appointed to Hong Kong Institute of Education but was fired by Fanny Law in the crisis of HKIEd-CUHK merger in 2007.

Ip was elected in Legislative Council of Hong Kong in September 2012 and retained his seat, with 71 percent of the votes cast, in 2016.

References

Living people
1961 births
i
Alumni of the University of Hong Kong
i
Meeting Point politicians
Democratic Party (Hong Kong) politicians
i
HK LegCo Members 2016–2021
Members of the Election Committee of Hong Kong, 2007–2012
Members of the Election Committee of Hong Kong, 2012–2017